Shangfeng is a village in Yangce, Biyang County, Zhumadian, Henan province, China  east of the town of Yangce, which it geographically is part of. It has over 1000 residents, and is surrounded on three sides by mountains. Locals primarily rely on agriculture, mainly growing wheat, soybean, sesame, and peanuts. Cattle and goats are also raised in the area.

References

Villages in China